
This is a list of the 32 players who earned their 2006 European Tour card through Q School in 2005.

 2006 European Tour rookie

2006 results

* European Tour rookie in 2006
T = Tied 
 The player retained his European Tour card for 2007 (finished inside the top 118).
 The player did not retain his European Tour card for 2007, but retained conditional status (finished between 119–150).
 The player did not retain his European Tour card for 2007 (finished outside the top 150).

Winners on the European Tour in 2006

Runners-up on the European Tour in 2006

See also
2005 Challenge Tour graduates
2006 European Tour

References
Final Results
Player biographies and records

European Tour
European Tour Qualifying School Graduates